Radju Malta 2 is a radio station in Malta. It is owned and operated by the Public Broadcasting Services of Malta: PBS Ltd.

Broadcasting on 105.9 FM across the Maltese islands, it provides music programmes as well as cultural, scientific, artistic, environmental and educational focused programmes. Live coverage of debates in the Maltese Parliament are also broadcast. It previously operated under the names: Buzz FM, TEN-66 FM, Radju Parlament, Maltin Biss

External links 
 

Radio stations in Malta